Carceliathrix is a genus of flies in the family Tachinidae.

Species
Carceliathrix crassipalpis (Villeneuve, 1938)

Distribution
Democratic Republic of the Congo.

References

Diptera of Africa
Exoristinae
Tachinidae genera
Monotypic Brachycera genera